Farm To Market Road 1905 (FM 1905) is a farm-to-market road in the U.S. state of Texas, maintained by the Texas Department of Transportation. The entire route is in the town of Anthony, which is located across the state line from New Mexico. It is the first road with which Interstate 10 has an interchange after entering Texas from New Mexico. FM 1905 begins at the state border as a continuation of NM 225, and ends at Interstate 10 in Anthony. A short segment is concurrent with SH 20. The FM 1905 designation was first assigned in 1951, and was extended to its current route in 1969.

History
FM 1905 was assigned on November 20, 1951 from the state line to U.S. Highway 80 (now State Highway 20).

Route description 
FM 1905 begins at the New Mexico state line, as a continuation of NM 225 in Anthony, New Mexico. The road, known as West Washington Street, parallels the state line as it heads eastward towards downtown Anthony. There are intersections with local roads before FM 1905 intersects SH 20 after . The two routes run concurrently along South Main Street for about  before FM 1905 continues eastward again, now heading towards IH 10 on Franklin Street. FM 1905 passes by a city-maintainted park complex before leaving downtown Anthony. It becomes known as Antonio Street as it enters the outskirts of Anthony, where it intersects with Spur 6 before coming to an end at exit 0 of IH 10.

Major intersections

See also

References

External links

 
 

1905
Transportation in El Paso County, Texas